The term Free Stater may refer to:

 Free-Stater (Kansas), (antislavery) settlers in Kansas Territory in the 1850s
 Free Stater (Ireland), those in Ireland who supported the Anglo-Irish Treaty of 1921
 A term informally used by some people in Northern Ireland to refer to residents of the Republic of Ireland
 A participant in the Free State Project

See also
 Free state (disambiguation)